Praprotnica is a small settlement in the Municipality of Mirna in southeastern Slovenia. It lies above Zabrdje to the south of Mirna. The area is part of the traditional region of Lower Carniola. The municipality is now included in the Southeast Slovenia Statistical Region.

References

External links
Praprotnica on Geopedia

Populated places in the Municipality of Mirna